This is a list of the songs that reached number-one position in official Polish single chart in ZPAV in 2010.

Chart history

Number-one artists

See also 
 List of number-one dance singles of 2010 (Poland)
 List of number-one albums of 2010 (Poland)

References 

Number-one singles
Poland
2010